Rawhide is a 1926 American silent Western film. Directed by Richard Thorpe, the film stars Jay Wilsey, Al Taylor, and Molly Malone. It was released on May 23, 1926.

Cast list
 Jay Wilsey as Rawhide Rawlins (credited as Buffalo Bill Jr.)
 Al Taylor as Jim Reep
 Molly Malone as Nan
 Joe Rickson as Strobel
 Slim Whitaker as Blackie Croont (credited as Charles Whitaker)
 Harry Todd as Two Gun
 Ruth Royce as Queenie
 Lafe McKee as the law

References

1926 Western (genre) films
1926 films
American black-and-white films
Associated Exhibitors films
Films directed by Richard Thorpe
Silent American Western (genre) films
1920s English-language films
1920s American films